Mara is a municipality in province of Zaragoza, Aragon, Spain. According to the 2008 census (INE), the municipality has a population of 212 inhabitants.

It is located in the Comunidad de Calatayud comarca, on a high plateau that is part of the Sierra de Vicort range.

The archaeological remains of the Celtiberian and Romano-Celtiberian town of Segeda-Sekeiza are located between Mara and the nearby Belmonte de Gracián.

References

External links
Official Website

Municipalities in the Province of Zaragoza